The Australia women's national soccer team results for the period 2020 to 2029.

Match results

2020

2021

2022

2023

See also 

 Australia women's national soccer team results (1975–99)
 Australia women's national soccer team results (2000–09)
 Australia women's national soccer team results (2010–19)

External links 

 Australian Results

References 

2020
2019–20 in Australian women's soccer
2020–21 in Australian women's soccer